The United States of America was created on July 4, 1776, with the U.S. Declaration of Independence of thirteen British colonies in North America. In the Lee Resolution, passed by the Second Continental Congress two days prior, the colonies resolved that they were free and independent states. The union was formalized in the Articles of Confederation, which came into force on March 1, 1781, after being ratified by all 13 states. Their independence was recognized by Great Britain in the Treaty of Paris of 1783, which concluded the American Revolutionary War. This effectively doubled the size of the colonies, now able to stretch west past the Proclamation Line to the Mississippi River. This land was organized into territories and then states, though there remained some conflict with the sea-to-sea grants claimed by some of the original colonies. In time, these grants were ceded to the federal government.

The first great expansion of the country came with the Louisiana Purchase of 1803, which doubled the country's territory, although the southeastern border with Spanish Florida was the subject of much dispute until it and Spanish claims to the Oregon Country were ceded to the US in 1821. The Oregon Country gave the United States access to the Pacific Ocean, though it was shared for a time with the United Kingdom. The annexation of the Republic of Texas in 1845 led directly to the Mexican–American War, after which the victorious United States obtained the northern half of Mexico's territory, including what was quickly made the state of California. However, as the development of the country moved west, the question of slavery became more important, with vigorous debate over whether the new territories would allow slavery and events such as the Missouri Compromise and Bleeding Kansas. This came to a head in 1860 and 1861, when the governments of the southern states proclaimed their secession from the country and formed the Confederate States of America. The American Civil War led to the defeat of the Confederacy in 1865 and the eventual readmission of the states to the United States Congress. The cultural endeavor and pursuit of manifest destiny provided a strong impetus for westward expansion in the 19th century.

The country began expanding beyond North America in 1856 with the passage of the Guano Islands Act, causing many small and uninhabited, but economically important, islands in the Pacific Ocean and Caribbean Sea to be claimed. Most of these claims were eventually abandoned, largely due to competing claims from other countries. The Pacific expansion culminated in the annexation of Hawaii in 1898, after the overthrow of its government five years previously. Alaska, the last major acquisition in North America, was purchased from Russia in 1867.

Support for the independence of Cuba from the Spanish Empire, and the sinking of the USS Maine, led to the Spanish–American War in 1898, in which the United States gained Guam, Puerto Rico, and the Philippines, and occupied Cuba for several years. American Samoa was acquired by the United States in 1900 after the end of the Second Samoan Civil War. The United States purchased the U.S. Virgin Islands from Denmark in 1917. Guam and Puerto Rico remain territories; the Philippines became independent in 1946, after being a major theater of World War II. Following the war, many islands were entrusted to the U.S. by the United Nations, and while the Northern Mariana Islands remain a U.S. territory, the Marshall Islands, Federated States of Micronesia, and Palau emerged from the trust territory as independent nations. The last major international change was the acquisition in 1904, and return to Panama in 1979, of the Panama Canal Zone, an unincorporated US territory which controlled the Panama Canal. The final cession of formal control over the region was made to Panama in 1999.

Regarding internal borders, while territories could shift wildly in size, once established states have generally retained their initial borders. Only four states—Maine, Kentucky, Vermont, and West Virginia—have been created from land claimed by another state; all of the others were created from territories or directly from acquisitions. Four states—Louisiana, Missouri, Nevada, and Pennsylvania—have  expanded significantly by acquiring additional federal territory after their initial admission to the Union. The last state of the contiguous United States, commonly called the "lower 48", was admitted in 1912; the fiftieth and most recent state was admitted in 1959.

Legend for maps
Key to map colors

1776–1784 (American Revolution)

1784–1803 (Organization of territory)

1803–1818 (Purchase of Louisiana)

1819–1845 (Northwest expansion)

1845–1860 (Southwest expansion)

1860–1865 (Civil War)

1866–1897 (Reconstruction and western statehood)

1898–1945 (Pacific and Caribbean expansion)

1946–present (Decolonization)

Bancos along the Rio Grande

The Banco Convention of 1905 between the United States and Mexico allowed, in the event of sudden changes in the course of the Rio Grande (as by flooding), for the border to be altered to follow the new course.  The sudden changes often created bancos (land surrounded by bends in the river that became segregated from either country by a cutoff, often due to rapid accretion or avulsion of the alluvial channel), especially in the Lower Rio Grande Valley. When these bancos are created, the International Boundary and Water Commission investigates if land previously belonging to the United States or Mexico is to be considered on the other side of the border. In all cases of these adjustments along the Rio Grande under the 1905 convention, which occurred on 37 different dates from 1910 to 1976, the transferred land was minuscule (ranging from one to 646 acres) and uninhabited.

See also

 Geography of the United States
 Territories of the United States
 Historic regions of the United States
 American frontier
 List of U.S. state partition proposals
 List of U.S. states by date of admission to the Union
 Movements for the annexation of Canada to the United States
 National Atlas of the United States
 Ostend Manifesto (annexation of Cuba)
 List of territorial claims and designations in Colorado
 Territorial evolution of Arizona
 Territorial evolution of California
 Territorial evolution of Idaho
 Territorial evolution of Montana
 Territorial evolution of Nevada
 Territorial evolution of New Mexico
 Territorial evolution of North Dakota
 Territorial evolution of Oregon
 Territorial evolution of South Dakota
 Territorial evolution of Utah
 Territorial evolution of Washington
 Territorial evolution of Wyoming
 Territories of the United States on stamps
 List of U.S.–Native American treaties, which indicates tribal land cessions

Notes

References

Further reading
 
 
 

 
Border-related lists
Borders of the United States
Borders of U.S. states
Former regions and territories of the United States
History of United States expansionism
History of colonialism